Tertullian Pyne was an Anglican priest in England during the 16th century.

Pyne was born in Devon and educated at St John's College, Oxford. He held the living at Swanscombe and was appointed Archdeacon of Sudbury in 1593.

References 

Alumni of St John's College, Oxford
Archdeacons of Sudbury
Clergy from Devon
16th-century English Anglican priests
People from Swanscombe